Hunmanby railway station serves the village of Hunmanby in North Yorkshire, England. It is located on the Yorkshire Coast Line and is operated by Northern Trains who provide all passenger train services. The station opened for traffic on 20 October 1847 and is the point at which the single track section from Bridlington ends, the line being double north of here towards Filey.

As originally built, the line was double throughout but the section to Bridlington was singled as an economy measure in 1973.  Further modernisation work saw the signal box here abolished and removed in 2000, with the level crossing automated and remaining semaphore signals replaced by colour lights operated remotely from Seamer.

The station is unstaffed and passengers must purchase their ticket on the train. The station buildings remain and are now privately occupied - the main waiting room and the separate ladies' waiting room having been converted to holiday accommodation.  Step-free access is available to both platforms via the automatic level crossing at the south end, whilst train running information can be obtained from timetable posters or telephone.

Local initiatives, such as door-to-door delivery of timetables in Hunmanby and surrounding villages, lead to a significant increase in patronage of this station between 2006 and 2008 and the increased number of passengers using this station has continued in subsequent years.

Services

From the May 2019 timetable change, an hourly service operates each way until mid-evening (including Sundays).

References

External links

 The Old Waiting Rooms The Self Catering accommodation provided in the converted waiting rooms.
 Station and signal box in 1997, prior to demolition of the latter

Railway stations in the Borough of Scarborough
DfT Category F2 stations
Railway stations in Great Britain opened in 1847
Northern franchise railway stations
Stations on the Hull to Scarborough line
1847 establishments in England
Former York and North Midland Railway stations
George Townsend Andrews railway stations
Hunmanby